Justin Hodgman (born June 27, 1988) is a retired Canadian professional ice hockey player who last played for UK Elite Ice Hockey League (EIHL) side Sheffield Steelers. Hodgman was most recently with Ferencvárosi TC of the Erste Liga.

Playing career
Hodgman was a three-time Turner Cup champion with the Fort Wayne Komets in the IHL. He is the youngest player in IHL history to win the Turner Cup playoff MVP award at the age of 19. He played junior hockey for the Erie Otters of the OHL. While playing for the Erie Otters he led the team in scoring three of his four seasons 2007, 2008, 2009. After going undrafted by NHL clubs, he signed as a free agent with the Rockford IceHogs of the American Hockey League in 2009. In his first full professional season in 2009–10, Hodgman was loaned to the ECHL team Toledo Walleye before he was traded by the IceHogs to the Toronto Marlies to play out the year on January 21, 2010.

After three seasons abroad in Finnish Liiga and the Russian Kontinental Hockey League , Hodgman returned to North America signing a one-year two way contract with the Arizona Coyotes on July 1, 2014. Despite a strong training camp, Hodgman was assigned to begin the year with the Portland Pirates. On October 25, 2015, Hodgman was recalled by Arizona and in his first NHL game, he scored his first career goal on the powerplay against Roberto Luongo of the Florida Panthers. Hodgman was unable to secure a regular role with the Coyotes, appearing in 5 games.

On July 8, 2015, Hodgman continued in North America, signing a one-year two-way contract with the St. Louis Blues. In the 2015–16 season, Hodgman was reassigned to add depth to AHL affiliate, the Chicago Wolves. He appeared in 15 games with the Wolves, producing 6 assists, before opting to return to Europe. After clearing unconditional waivers and accepting a mutual termination of his contract with the Blues, Hodgman signed an optional two-year deal with Swedish club, Örebro HK of the top tier SHL on January 4, 2016.

Hodgman split the 2016–17 season, between HC Dynamo Pardubice of the Czech Extraliga and Pelicans of the Liiga. In scoring 20 points in 26 games in his second stint with the Pelicans.

Hodgman opted to return in the offseason to his first professional club, the Fort Wayne Komets of the ECHL on July 18, 2017. Hodgman played two further seasons in Fort Wayne, before returning to Europe following the 2018–19 campaign in signing a one-year contract with German club, Krefeld Pinguine of the DEL, on May 29, 2019.

Hodgman continued his career abroad in the 2020–21 season moving to Ferencvárosi TC of the Erste Liga in Budapest, Hungary.

In June 2021, UK EIHL side Sheffield Steelers announced Hodgman had signed terms ahead of the 2021–22 season. Hodgman retired from hockey in April 2022 following Sheffield's play-off quarter-final defeat to the Dundee Stars.

Career statistics

Regular season and playoffs

References

External links

1988 births
Admiral Vladivostok players
Arizona Coyotes players
Canadian expatriate ice hockey players in Finland
Canadian expatriate ice hockey players in Russia
Canadian expatriate ice hockey players in Sweden
Canadian expatriate ice hockey players in the Czech Republic
Canadian ice hockey centres
Chicago Wolves players
Erie Otters players
Ferencvárosi TC (ice hockey) players
Fort Wayne Komets players
HC Dynamo Pardubice players
Krefeld Pinguine players
Lahti Pelicans players
Living people
Metallurg Magnitogorsk players
Örebro HK players
Portland Pirates players
Reading Royals players
Sheffield Steelers players
Toledo Walleye players
Toronto Marlies players
Torpedo Nizhny Novgorod players
Undrafted National Hockey League players
Canadian expatriate ice hockey players in the United States
Canadian expatriate ice hockey players in Germany
Canadian expatriate ice hockey players in England
Canadian expatriate ice hockey players in Hungary
Sportspeople from Brampton
Ice hockey people from Ontario